Reverend Donald Raymond Vails, Jr. (December 25, 1948 – September 10, 1997), was an American gospel musician and pianist. He started his recorded music career in 1977, with the release, Donald Vails Choraleers on Savoy Records. He would release sixteen albums with two labels, Savoy Records and Sound of Gospel. Vails released five albums that charted on the Billboard magazine Gospel Albums chart, He Promised a New Life in 1984 with Savoy Records, 1986's Yesterday, Today and Forever with Sounds of Gospel, 1987's Until the Rapture again with Sounds of Gospel, In Jesus Christ I Have Everything I Need in 1990 also with Sounds of Gospel, and 1994's  A Sunday Morning Songbook with Savoy Records. The album, He Decided to Die, was a Grammy Award-nominated release, and it was certified as a gold album by the RIAA.

Early life
Vails was born on December 25, 1948, in Atlanta, Georgia, as Donald Raymond Vails, Jr., whose parents sent him to a nursery school at Gospel Choral Union, and this instilled in him a love of gospel music and the piano. He was reared in the church in his hometown at Mt. Zion Baptist Church. He was leading a choir by age twelve, and after high school, as an eighteen-year-old relocated to Detroit, Michigan to pursue a degree in engineering at Detroit Institute of Technology. While he was doing this, he formed The Choraleers in 1969. Vails relocated to Washington, D.C. in 1985 to attain a Master's Degree in Music at Howard University. During this time, he became a member of Ebenezer AME Church located in Fort Washington, Maryland, and this caused the church's choir to grow from 40 to 175 participants in the span of a couple of months. He established, Salvation Corporation, during his time in D.C., which was an 80-member interdenominational choir.

Music career
He began his recorded music career in 1977, with the release of Donald Vails Choraleers on Savoy Records. His sixteen albums made the Billboard magazine Gospel Albums chart, for five of those releases. Those releases are the following; He Promised a New Life in 1984 with Savoy Records at No. 32, No. 17 for Yesterday, Today and Forever with Sound of Gospel in 1986, 1987's Until the Rapture at No. 11 with Sound of Gospel, In Jesus Christ I Have Everything I Need again with Sound of Gospel in 1990 peaking at No. 26, and 1994's A Sunday Morning Songbook at No. 33 with Savoy Records. They would achieve a gold album certification by the RIAA and a Grammy Award nomination for their 1978 album, He Decided To Die, with Savoy Records.

Personal life
Vails was married to Janine Vails (née, Anderson) at the time of his death on September 10, 1997, from a lengthy illness in Clinton, Maryland. He was survived by two children, Brian and Carmen.

Discography

References

External links
 Cross Rhythms Profile

1948 births
1997 deaths
African-American songwriters
African-American Christians
Musicians from Atlanta
Musicians from Detroit
Musicians from Washington, D.C.
Musicians from Maryland
Songwriters from Georgia (U.S. state)
Songwriters from Maryland
Songwriters from Michigan
Songwriters from Washington, D.C.
American male songwriters
20th-century male musicians
20th-century African-American people